Yves Montand Niyongabo is a Rwandan film director.

Background 
Yves was born and raised in Burundi. He later moved to Rwanda where he quit law for film making. He has worked as a production coordinator for the 2017 film Munyurangabo. In 2010 Yves was selected for a film workshop organized by CPH:Dox in Denmark.

Filmography 

 Maibobo - 2010.
 Slim Land - 2012
 Giti – Paradise in Hell - 2014
 The Invincible - 2014
 Munyurangabo - 2017

Awards 

 Organisation internationale de la Francophonie (OIF) Prize, 2013.
 Goethe Institut, Best Scriptwriter Award, 2013.

References 

Year of birth missing (living people)
Living people
Rwandan film directors